Stephen McAllister (born 16 February 1962) is a Scottish professional golfer.

Early life
McAllister was born in Paisley.

Career
McAllister won the Lytham Trophy in 1983 and turned professional later that year. He first played on the European Tour in 1987. His career year was 1990, when he won his only two European Tour titles, the Atlantic Open and the KLM Dutch Open, and finished nineteenth on the European Tour Order of Merit. He also won two non-tour professional tournaments, the 1987 Scottish Masters and the 1988 Toyota Cup. His tour career came to an end in 2000 and he later worked as a golf coach and corporate golf manager.

Amateur wins
1983 Lytham Trophy

Professional wins (4)

European Tour wins (2)

European Tour playoff record (1–0)

Other wins (2)
1987 Sunderland Sportswear Masters
1988 Toyota Cup (Denmark)

Results in major championships

Note: McAllister only played in The Open Championship.

CUT = missed the half-way cut

Team appearances
Amateur
European Amateur Team Championship (representing Scotland): 1983

Professional
Dunhill Cup (representing Scotland): 1990

References

External links

Scottish male golfers
European Tour golfers
1962 births
Living people